This list of paintings by the Bengali painter Zainul Abedin is incomplete.

Notes and references

Notes

References
 
 

Abedin, Zainul
Zainul Abedin